James Tuder or Tudor Nelthorpe (c.1784 - 11 June 1868) was an English local magistrate and landowner, principally active as a Justice of the Peace in Nuthurst, West Sussex.

Born James Cowne, he took on the surnames Tudor/Tuder and Nelthorpe on inheriting the estate of Sedgwick manor in Little Broadwater from his aunt Elizabeth Nelthorpe. By the 1840s he held almost 900 acres in total in his estates in Nuthurst and Little Broadwater. As of the 1841 census he was living at Nuthurst Lodge with the family of Richard Mayne, then Commissioner of the Metropolitan Police, who later served as one of the executors to Nelthorpe's will.

References

1780s births
1868 deaths
English justices of the peace
People from Horsham District
People from Broadwater, West Sussex